Les Corts may refer to:

 Camp de Les Corts, the former home ground of FC Barcelona
 Les Corts (district), a district of Barcelona
 Les Corts (neighbourhood), one of the 3 neighborhoods within the district of Les Corts, in Barcelona
 Les Corts (Barcelona Metro), a station of the Barcelona metro in Les Corts district

See also
Corts (disambiguation)